TKO Records is an independent punk rock record label in Portland, Oregon. The label is primarily known for its role in the late 1990s American street punk scene and has continued its notability as a source of new releases, reissues, and archival recordings.  The OC Weekly newspaper recognized the label as "best record label" in Orange County in 2011 and its record store of the same name as "best punk-rock record store" in Orange County, 2008.

History

TKO Records was founded by Mark Rainey in 1997 in San Francisco, California. Early on the label rose to prominence with releases from the Dropkick Murphys, Lower Class Brats, Anti-Heros,  Swingin' Utters, The Templars, Pressure Point, Workin' Stiffs, U.S. Bombs, and The Forgotten. The label helped to establish a sound and aesthetic for the street punk scene in the United States that was then rising in popularity. As TKO's prominence within the punk rock scene increased, the label also began releasing records from veteran punk bands such as Cocksparrer, Angelic Upstarts, the Partisans, Slaughter and the Dogs, The Bruisers, Chelsea, The Business, The Real Kids, and Antiseen.

Eventually the label relocated to Orange County, California and from 2000 to 2005 continued building a name with notable releases from "Beach Punk" bands such as the Smut Peddlers, the Stitches, Smogtown, the Crowd and Broken Bottles while continuing to release street punk and Oi! records.

In 2007 TKO Records opened a record store in Fountain Valley, California as part of the label's ten year anniversary. The label continues to release reissues and archival recordings from seminal punk bands, such as Poison Idea, the Templars, T.S.O.L., The Meatmen, Antiseen, No For An Answer, Channel 3, and Iron Cross, as well as new recordings from Giuda,  The label's store front relocated to Huntington Beach, California in 2013 and has hosted readings from punk rock related writers, such as Tesco Vee, Jack Grisham, Alice Bag, Chris D. and Legs McNeil, as well live performances from artists including Deniz Tek, Chuck Dukowski, Scott Weinrich, Joe Keithley and Channel 3. The store specializes in rare, out of print records, as well as new releases from punk, hardcore, garage, reggae, ska, rock, and metal bands.

In the Fall of 2014, the label relocated to Portland, Oregon.

After being sold to new owners in 2016, the TKO Records record store in Huntington Beach, CA closed in January 2020.

Mark Rainey has also co-run the imprint record label Flat Records, along with Ken Casey of the Dropkick Murphys. Flat's releases have included records from Agnostic Front and Blood For Blood.

Roster
 ANTiSEEN (2000-Present)
 Lower Class Brats (1997-Present)
 Poison Idea (2007-Present)
 the Templars (1997-Present)

Former

 46 Short
 Adolf and the Piss Artists
 GG Allin & ANTiSEEN
 Angelic Upstarts
 Anti-Heros
 Bad Luck Charms (side project with members of U.S. Bombs)
 the Beltones
 Blood Stained Kings (featuring Yoji Harada)
 The Bodies
 The Boils
 Bottles & Skulls (featuring members of Triclops!)
 Broken Bottles
 The Bruisers
 The Business
 Channel 3
 Chelsea
 Class Assassins
 Cocknoose
 Cocksparrer
 Complete Control
 The Crowd
 The Crumbs
 Deadbolt
 Dead End Cruisers
 Demented Are Go
 The Distraction (featuring members of Le Shok)
 Dropkick Murphys
 Electric Frankenstein
 The Escape
 Filthy Thievin' Bastards
 The Flesh Eaters
 The Forgotten
 Glass Heroes
 The Generators
 Giuda
 Hammerlock
 Hank III
 Hard Skin
 Hatepinks
 Hollywood Hate (featuring Scotty Wilkins)
 Iron Cross
 Kill Your Idols
 The Krays
 Krum Bums
 Last Target (featuring members of Thug Murder)
 Limecell
 the Loose Lips
 Meatmen
 Nazi Dogs
 New York Rel-X (featuring members of The Krays
 Niblick Henbane
 No for an Answer
 The Obsessed
 Old Firm Casuals (featuring Lars Frederiksen)
 One Man Army
 The Partisans
 Peter and the Test Tube Babies
 Pressure Point
 The Radicts
 the Randumbs
 Real Kids
 Reducers SF
 The Rhythm Doctors 
 The Riffs
 Slaughter and the Dogs
 Shock Nagasaki
 Smogtown
 Smut Peddlers
 The Stitches
 Straitjacket
 Strychnine
 Swingin' Utters
 The Templars
 Terminus City
 Those Unknown
 Tommy and the Terrors
 The Truents
 T.S.O.L.
 The Upsets
 U.S. Bombs
 Vicious Circle (pre-T.S.O.L.)
 Workin' Stiffs
 Wretched Ones
 YDi

Flat Records roster
 30 Seconds Over Tokyo
 All Systems Stop
 Agnostic Front
 BeerZone
 Big Bad Bollocks
 Blood For Blood
 the Bruisers
 The Cuffs
 Dropkick Murphys
 The Drunks
 Ducky Boys
 Hudson Falcons
 Main Street Saints
 Oxymoron
 Pressure Point
 The Randumbs
 Runnin' Riot
 The Shods
 Terminus City
 Thug Murder
 The Trouble
 The Vigilantes

References

Companies based in Huntington Beach, California
Punk record labels
American independent record labels
Record labels established in 1997
Music retailers of the United States
American companies established in 1997
1997 establishments in California